Annie Taylor may refer to:

Annie Edson Taylor (1838–1921), first American to ride Niagara Falls in a barrel
Annie Taylor Hyde (1849–1909), American Mormon leader and Utah pioneer
Annie Royle Taylor (1855–1922), British evangelist to China and Tibetan explorer

See also
Ann Taylor (disambiguation)